George Edwin Smith (April 5, 1849 – April 26, 1919) was a Massachusetts lawyer, legal writer, and politician. He served three terms as the President of the Massachusetts Senate. Previous to his assumption of the Senate Presidency, he served as a member of the Massachusetts Senate, elected from the Massachusetts House of Representatives.

Early life and education 
George Edwin Smith was born April 5, 1849, in New Hampton, New Hampshire to David H. and Esther Perkins. He was educated in common schools in New Hampton and began his formal education at the Nichols Latin School before enrolling Bates College in Lewiston, Maine. He graduated Bates, with high honors, in 1873. His time at Bates sparked his interests in the law, and began to clerk for the at-the-time Maine Senator, William P. Frye, at his private legal firm. Smith went on to pass the Suffolk County bar in Boston in May 1973.

Early political career 
In his early political career he was elected to the Massachusetts House of Representatives, representing the 8th Middlesex District comprising Malden and Everett, in 1883. He was subsequently re-elected 1884 with an increased voting turnout.

In 1892, he was a candidate for Mayor of Everett, and the lead the town into conception. He went on to serve on the Board of Trustees of the Public Library of Massachusetts, and chaired the committee that drew the charter for the newly founded city of Everett.

Other business and educational pursuits 
In 1879, he was elected by the alumni of Bates College to serves on the board of overseers. In 1884, he was appointed by the Bates Corporation to serve on the board of the president and was selected as a fellow of the college.

He also served as the president of the Glendon Club.

Death
Smith died at the Parker House Hotel in Boston, Massachusetts on April 26, 1919.

See also
 119th Massachusetts General Court (1898)
 121st Massachusetts General Court (1900)

References

1849 births
Bates College alumni
Massachusetts lawyers
Politicians from Everett, Massachusetts
Republican Party members of the Massachusetts House of Representatives
Republican Party Massachusetts state senators
Presidents of the Massachusetts Senate
1919 deaths
19th-century American politicians
People from New Hampton, New Hampshire
19th-century American lawyers